Oleg Alekseyevich Zykov (born 17 August 1970 in Kirov) is a Russian football coach and a former player.

External links
 

1970 births
Sportspeople from Kirov, Kirov Oblast
Living people
Soviet footballers
FC Dynamo Kirov players
PFC Krylia Sovetov Samara players
Russian footballers
Association football forwards
Russian Premier League players
FC Sokol Saratov players
Russian football managers
FC Volga Ulyanovsk players